Bilibili is a Chinese video hosting website. It is known for 2channel culture, Japanese anime, manga, and Chinese animation. The site is also hosts user-generated content.

Chinese animation/donghua

Co-production

Original variety/reality/talk show/special

Co-production

Original documentary

Exclusive China distribution

Japanese Anime

Others

Notes

References 

Chinese websites
Lists of television series by streaming service